FZ, F-Z, Fz, or fz may refer to:

Arts and entertainment
 Fold Zandura, an American alternative rock band
 Forzando, in music, forcingly, with strong emphasis, like an accent
 Frank Zappa, an American composer, musician, and film director
 F-Zero, a futuristic racing video game by Nintendo

Science and technology
 FileZilla, an FTP client and FTP server
 Float-zone silicon, very pure silicon obtained by vertical zone melting
 Fracture zone, in geology

Other uses
 Farhan Zaman, an short form of a Name
 Flydubai (IATA airline designator)
 Forges de Zeebrugge, an arms manufacturer in Belgium
 Franc zone, a currency area in Africa
 Free Zone (disambiguation)
 Friend zone, a platonic relationship (texting slang)
 Fuzhou, the capital of Fujian province in China
 Fz: an EEG electrode site according to the 10-20 system